Youssef El Fahli (born 27 April 1997) is a Moroccan professional footballer who plays as a forward for Moroccan club Hassania Agadir.

References

External links
 
 

Moroccan footballers
1997 births
Living people
Hassania Agadir players
Association football forwards